USS Duffy (DE-27) was an  that served in the Pacific during World War II.

Namesake
Charles John Duffy was born 31 December 1919 in New York City. He enlisted in the United States Naval Reserve on 25 April 1941 and was appointed an aviation cadet on 13 November 1941. Flying a carrier aircraft. Ensign Duffy was killed in action during the Naval Battle of Casablanca, French Morocco, 8 November 1942 during the Allied landings in North Africa.

Construction and commissioning
Duffy was launched from the Mare Island Navy Yard on 16 April 1943, and was originally intended for transfer to the British Royal Navy. Instead, she was commissioned by the U.S. Navy on 5 August 1943.

Service history
Duffy was mainly involved in escorting supply ships and as part of larger carrier groups, taking credit for downing a twin-engine Japanese "Betty" bomber in December 1944 at Leyte. On 29 December, Duffy fired a shore bombardment on Maloelap while covering air strikes. Duffy continued to bombard and wage psychological warfare on various bypassed islands, and on 14 June 1945, she took prisoner seven men of the cutoff garrison on Mille Atoll.

At the end of the war, Duffy sailed back to San Francisco, where she arrived on 26 July 1945. She was decommissioned there on 9 November 1945 and sold for scrap on 16 June 1947.

Awards

References

External links
 
 

Evarts-class destroyer escorts
World War II frigates and destroyer escorts of the United States
Ships built in Vallejo, California
1943 ships